Admete is a name attributed to:
Admete (mythology)
Admete (gastropod), a gastropod of the family Cancellariidae
398 Admete, a main belt asteroid